"Is acher in gaíth in-nocht..." is an anonymous 9th-century poem in Old Irish.

The poem exists uniquely as a marginal entry in the Stiftsbibliothek MS 904 at the Abbey of St. Gallen in Switzerland, which is a copy of Priscian's Institutiones grammaticae, heavily glossed in Old Irish. It was most likely written in Ireland in the (mid-?) 9th century, when Viking attacks on Irish monasteries, schools and churches were a regular occurrence.

Irish singer and academic Pádraigín Ní Uallacháin arranged and recorded the poem in Copenhagen after visiting St. Gallen. It appears on her 2011 Songs of the Scribe studio album.

Text
The text of the poem is as follows:

See also
 Early Medieval Ireland 800–1166

References
 Bruno Güterbock (1895), Aus irischen Handschriften in Turin und Rom, Zeitschrift für Vergleichende Sprachforschung, 33. 
 R. Thurneysen (1949), Old Irish Reader 39, tr. D. A. Binchy and Osborn Bergin.
 David Dumville (1987), Three men in a boat ... Cambridge Medieval Studies, pp. 23–29. 
 Donnchadh Ó Corráin (1998), Vikings in Ireland and Scotland in the Ninth Century Perita 12, pp. 296–339.

External links

 CELT News
 Donnchadh Ó Corráin, "Vikings in Ireland and Scotland in the Ninth Century"

9th century in Ireland
9th-century poems
Early Irish literature
Irish literature
Irish poems
Irish-language literature
Manuscripts of the Abbey library of Saint Gall